Andrea María Tobar Quan (born 8 July 1988) is a Guatemalan retired footballer who played as a midfielder. She has been a member of the Guatemala women's national team. She was the first Guatemalan female player to play in South America in Brazil for the Universidad do Parana in the year 2007.

Starting as a football player she transitioned to indoor soccer in the year 2010. That same year she compete with the national team i. The first invitational female indoor soccer world cup that was celebrated in Spain in December of that same year.

International career
Tobar capped for Guatemala at senior level during the 2010 CONCACAF Women's World Cup Qualifying qualification and the 2012 CONCACAF Women's Olympic Qualifying Tournament (and its qualification)

References

1988 births
Living people
Guatemalan women's footballers
Guatemala women's international footballers
Women's association football midfielders
Guatemalan people of Chinese descent
Sportspeople of Chinese descent